The DFS 193 was a planned experimental German aircraft of the 1930s planned by Deutsche Forschungsanstalt für Segelflug (DFS). Designed by Professor Alexander Lippisch and a DFS employee named Roth, it resembled Lippisch's Storch IX and the Gotha Go 147.

Design and development
The DFS 193 was a two-seat tailless aircraft designed to explore the military potential of this layout. Although a mockup was tested in a wind tunnel in 1936, it was abandoned in 1938 because it did not show any improvement over traditional designs. The aircraft was therefore never built.

Specifications

Notes

References

DFS 193
Tailless aircraft
1930s German experimental aircraft
Single-engined tractor aircraft